Andrew Beeler (born 1992) is an American politician and former United States Navy officer serving as a member of the Michigan House of Representatives from the 83rd district. Elected in November 2020, he assumed office on January 1, 2021.

Early life and education 
Beeler was born and raised in Port Huron, Michigan. After graduating from Cardinal Mooney Catholic High School, he accepted an appointment to the United States Naval Academy, where he earned a Bachelor of Science degree in naval architecture.

Career 
After graduating from the Naval Academy, Beeler was commissioned as an ensign in 2014. A surface warfare officer, he was assigned to the USS Chancellorsville and USS Decatur. Beeler was deployed to the South China Sea and Middle East before receiving a discharge from the Navy in 2019. Beeler then returned to Port Huron and became a candidate for the Michigan House of Representatives. He was elected in November 2020 and assumed office on January 1, 2021.

References 

Living people
1992 births
People from Port Huron, Michigan
United States Naval Academy alumni
University of Chicago alumni
Republican Party members of the Michigan House of Representatives
21st-century American politicians
Military personnel from Michigan